Antonio Vila-Coro Nadal (12 July 1895 – 13 January 1977) was a Spanish water polo player. He competed in the men's tournament at the 1920 Summer Olympics.

References

External links
 

1895 births
1977 deaths
Spanish male water polo players
Olympic water polo players of Spain
Water polo players at the 1920 Summer Olympics
Water polo players from the Community of Madrid
Sportspeople from Madrid